The 1917 Camp Gordon football team represented Camp Gordon in Chamblee, Georgia, during the 1917 college football season.

The team was led by a backfield of former Auburn back and war hero Kirk Newell, former Mercer back Cochran, former Georgia halfback Bob McWhorter, and former Vanderbilt back Wilson Collins. Former Alabama fullback Adrian Van de Graaff backed up Collins. Kid Woodruff of Georgia backed up Newell at quarterback.

On the line, the teams ends were former Virginia player James L. White and former Auburn player Henry W. Robinson. VMI's Blandy Clarkson and Chicago's Royal were tackles.  Dartmouth's Lewis and Charles H. Brown of Vanderbilt were guards. James Bond of Pitt was the team's center. Georgia's Tom Thrash was a sub tackle.

Walter Camp Jr. officiated the Camp Hancock game. Oglethorpe's coach Frank B. Anderson was umpire.

Schedule

References

Camp Gordon
Camp Gordon football seasons
Camp Gordon football